Nyle Wiren (born February 8, 1973) is a former American football defensive lineman who played eleven seasons with the Tampa Bay Storm of the Arena Football League (AFL). He played college football at Kansas State University.

College career
Wiren played for the Kansas State Wildcats from 1993 to 1996. He set Kansas State records for most career sacks with 27.5 and most sacks in a season with 11.5 in 1996. He earned All-America honorable mention honors his senior year in 1996.

Professional career
Wiren played for the AFL's Tampa Bay Storm from 1998 to 2008, earning Second Team All-Arena honors in 2004. He retired after the 2008 season.

Coaching career
Wiren was an assistant coach for the Tampa Bay Storm in 2011.

Personal life
Wiren was a double for Stone Cold Steve Austin in The Longest Yard.

References

External links
Just Sports Stats

Living people
1973 births
Players of American football from Wichita, Kansas
American football defensive linemen
Kansas State Wildcats football players
Tampa Bay Storm players
Tampa Bay Storm coaches